Saken Seifullin (Säken (Säduaqas) Seifullin; 15 October 1894 – 25 April 1938) was a pioneer of modern Kazakh literature, poet and writer, and national activist. He was the founder and first head of the Union of Writers of Kazakhstan, he was the author of controversial literature calling for greater independence of Kazakhs from Soviet and Russian power. He met repression and was executed in 1938. The Soviet government posthumously rehabilitated him during de-Stalinization.

Biography
Seifullin was born in a nomadic settlement in what is today Qarağandy Region.

Education
From 1905 to 1908, Seifullin studied in a Russian-Kazakh school in the Spassk brass works. He went on to study in Aqmola in the primary parish school and the Aqmola three-class city school. In addition, he taught Russian at a Muslim madrasah. On August 21 of 1913, Seifullin entered the Omsk teaching seminarium. His first article was published in the November edition of Ay Qap magazine. It was at this time that he began to be spied upon by the Omsk okhrana, the secret police.

In 1914, Seifullin became one of the heads of the first cultural and educational society of Kazakh youth, Bırlık (Unity) in Omsk. His book of poetry Ötken Künder (Past Days) was published that year.

In 1916, he worked on a property census commission for the 12 volosts of Akmolinsk Uezd. In that year he wrote the poem Volnenie (Unrest), dedicated to Central Asian unrest in 1916. From September 1 of 1916 he taught in Bugula school, which he co-founded.

On 9 March 1917 he moved to Aqmola, where he wrote a welcoming poem for the February revolution, Bız asyğys jinaldyq (We quickly gathered to march). In April of that year, Seifullin created a social-political and cultural society named Jas Qazaq (Young Kazakh). In July, he contributed to an issue of Tırşılık (Life) newspaper. In September, Seifullin began teaching three-month pedagogical courses in the new Russian-Kazakh school in Akmolinsk.

Right after the Russian Revolution, Seifullin wrote a poem, "А ну-ка, джигиты!", which is said to be the first work of Kazakh Soviet literature. On 27 December 1917, the Soviet regime was established in Akmolinsk. Seifullin was elected a member of the Aqmola Deputy Board and was appointed national commissar of education. In February, he was admitted to the Party. On 1 May 1918 his play, Baqyt Jolyna (On the Way of Happiness), was performed for the first time.

Civil War
When on June 4, 1918, the White Guard conducted a revolution, Seifullin was arrested and sent to Petropavlovsk jail. He was put in a Death Carriage of Ataman Boris Annenkov, where he spent 47 days. He broke out of Kolchak Prison and reached his village by July. After two months he was forced to flee for Taraz.

Capture and execution
Seifullin was arrested by the agents of the NKVD from Moscow in 25 April 1938 and executed in Almaty, Kazakh SSR, deemed a "threat to the society" and a "nationalist". However, since Independence, Säken Seifullin is often considered one of the most influential Kazakh thinkers of the 20st century, a major contributor to Kazakh culture and literature, and a martyr for freedom.

References

1894 births
1938 deaths
Kazakh-language writers
Kazakhstani Muslims
Great Purge victims from Kazakhstan
Soviet rehabilitations
People from Karaganda Region